The 2006 Harlow District Council election took place on 4 May 2006 to elect members of Harlow District Council in Essex, England. One third of the council was up for election and the council stayed under no overall control.

After the election, the composition of the council was
Conservative 12
Labour 11
Liberal Democrats 10

Election result
Overall turnout at the election was 36.93%.

Ward results

Bush Fair

Church Langley

Great Parndon

Harlow Common

Little Parndon & Hare Street

Mark Hall

Netteswell

Old Harlow

Staple Tye (2 seats)

Sumners and Kingsmoor

Toddbrook

References

2006
2006 English local elections
2000s in Essex